Walthamstow Hall is a private day school for girls in the centre of Sevenoaks, Kent, England.

History
Walthamstow Hall was founded in 1838 and is one of the oldest all-girl independent schools in the country. It was founded as an inter-denominational mission school and home for the daughters of Christian missionaries. It provides an 'all-through' education with a Junior School for girls aged 3–11 and a Senior School for girls aged 11–18. The school is named after the village of Walthamstow where it was founded. In 1838 the village was five miles from London. It moved to the site in Holly Bush Lane, Sevenoaks on 17 May 1882. The Junior School moved to its present site in Bradbourne Park Road following the closure of St Hilary's School in 1992.

In 1838 five little girls sat on five wooden stools made for them at the opening meeting of the school and home for missionaries' daughters in Marsh Street, Walthamstow. Mrs Foulger was a founder and benefactor of the school and created the first band of helpers to set up the school and care for the children of missionaries working in remote places including India and China. The school was the first of its kind in the country and daughters of all evangelical missionaries were received, including the Church Missionary Society until it opened its own school.

In 1837 the year before the school was founded, Victoria became queen and her position and character did much to help their cause. The 19th Century was a ground-breaking century for the recognition and education of young women. Pioneers of female education were a hard-headed, hard-working, idealistic and common sense group of middle-class, Christian women. Subjects taught included reading, writing, accounts, English, history, geography, and Latin. Languages and sciences were considered important as girls were expected to enter the missionary service in later years.

Male students were sent to The School for the Sons of Missionaries (founded in 1842 by Mr Foulger in Walthamstow, Dr Bell's in Stockwell in 1852, to Blackheath in 1857 and then Eltham College in 1912) set up under similar circumstances.

In 1873 three Walthamstow Hall pupils were entered for the Cambridge Examination for the first time. Two passed and one with honours. The next year, a student called Mary Wallis received Lady Goldsmith's Latin Prize, a distinction attained by only 15 girls in England. Between 1841 and 1878 girls who left Walthamstow Hall went on to live challenging lives: 57 became teachers, 37 were wives of ministers or missionaries, 18 became missionaries, 8 went into clerical work, 4 became nurses, 3 became doctors, 1 became a milliner, one a school matron and one a wood engraver.

From just five girls in 1838 the school expanded rapidly and despite many building extensions and leasing of the adjoining property it was obvious that the site was just not big enough. The school continued to grow and the waiting list ever increased. Walthamstow was no longer a country village as the railway had arrived. 10 years later it was decided to move to Sevenoaks.

Mrs Foulger's daughter Emily, who many year later married the physician Philip Henry Pye-Smith, lived in Sevenoaks, and found a suitable site for the building of the new school. The architect was Edward C Robins (the same firm which built Caterham School in 1880). The foundation stone was laid at Sevenoaks on 26 June 1878 by the Rt Hon W E Forster MP. Four years later in 1882 the building was completed and the school community moved in.

The same year the girls moved into their new Sevenoaks home, two whole classes were sent up for the Cambridge examinations. Throughout its history girls have gone on to make their mark on the world. Leavers in the late 19th century gained places and scholarships at universities. Some were the first women admitted to universities which historically had only ever admitted young men.

The school was recognised in 1903. Girls had been taking the Cambridge Examinations but Miss Hare invited an inspection by the University of London so that their examinations could be taken instead. This evolved to become one General School Examination. In 1904 the Gymnasium then called the 'Play-Room' was opened in the same year that day-girls were first admitted after much consideration.

Miss Hare had the burden of responsibility for the welfare and safety of the girls during the war years. As a result, the hardships which ensued made it possible for Walthamstow Hall and Eltham College, in a similar circumstance, to make a Joint Church Appeal for £10,000 in 1921. They had the backing of the two Missionary Societies and the funding was received the following year. To ensure the future, negotiations were entered into with the Board of Education for the receipt of a Government Grant. Miss Euphemia Leys Ramsay was appointed as Miss Hare's successor in 1922.

Miss Ramsay was keen to encourage extra curricular and cultural activities and even today the school holds a 'Ramsay Occasion' in her memory when a distinguished lecturer from the world of the Arts/Media is invited.

From 1940 to 1945 Walthamstow Hall was in the battle zone of the Second World War. Miss Ramsay's spirit and cheerfulness belied the stresses and strains of her responsibility. On the night of 21 September 1940 when the new laboratory, craft rooms and old gymnasium were destroyed by bombs and damage caused to the whole school she remained undaunted, and as a result so too did the staff and 37 boarders who were in residence! Luckily no one was hurt.

During this time Sevenoaks was in a reception area and the school became a clearing home for evacuees, first for mothers and babies. It also became an Air Raid Wardens' Post and members of staff shared a rota night fire-watching. During school-time raids, lessons and exams went on in the trenches which had been built in the grounds, the children sitting on their bunks.

The flying bombs posed the greatest menace and there were many false alarms! One speech day took place partly underground until the skies cleared.

Miss Ramsay arranged to evacuate the Junior Boarders and younger day girls to Attingham Park near Shrewsbury (shared temporarily with girls from Egbaston Girls School in Birmingham) near to where Miss Blackburn taught, and arranged regular three weeks' visits with specialist teachers dispatched to supervise the work. They moved to Pontesford House, 9 miles from Shrewsbury and stayed there until 1944. Nothing got in the way of the girls' education, not even the war!

V.E. Day celebrations in 1946 were enjoyed and the school's close links with France re-established much to the delight of Miss Ramsay. The first French Assistante to be appointed since the war was celebrated with a French play in which Miss Ramsay had a starring role. Later that year she retired and was succeeded by Miss Emmeline Blackburn, one of Miss Ramsay's old scholars.

In 1968 the headmistress reported to the governors that the Ordinary Level results were 'phenomenal' and in 1971 Oxbridge places were achieved in Geography, Medicine, French and German, History, English (2), Biology and French and Latin. This was a rough indication of standards. At this time the Governors were considering the provision of further accommodation for the Sixth Form and in 1970, Brentor, a house in Vine Court Road was officially opened as a Sixth Form Centre and renamed E. B. H. in honour of Miss Blackburn who was about to celebrate 24 successful and dedicated years as headmistress.

In 1976 The Friends and Parents of Walthamstow Hall was launched (FPWH). The association has provided The Friends and Parents' Bursary Scheme since then. To this day no girl who can benefit should be prevented from attending for financial reasons.

The buildings and grounds were developed steadily during the 1970s with generous gifts from an Eltham Old Boy, Mr Dudley Witting who made possible the development of a new suite of language rooms and major developments at the Junior School. Extensive fund-raising made possible the building of The Eric Salmon Wing, opened in 1975, which houses art studios, teaching suites, ICT and Junior Careers. This was named after the much respected chairman of the governors who served the school for many years. The last development during Miss Davies' custodianship was the building of the squash courts opened in 1984.

One of the major benefits for these improved facilities was the development of the curriculum. Computer Studies became a firm addition in 1979 thanks to the improved facilities and equipment. Improvements to facilities in all departments continue to this day with an ongoing development plan which has similarities to the Forth Bridge! Responding to the demands of an ever-changing society the development in Careers Education has been a priority. It is now very sophisticated with multimedia tools, conferences, workshops and specialist conventions forming part of school life. Girls have many opportunities to sample the experience of work in the 'real world' armed with a thorough knowledge of what is expected of them. Work experience was introduced in 1984 for upper four (Year 9) and in 1987 a special link with Liberty's was created which provided management placements. Girls are still enjoying this valuable experience and travel widely to pursue valuable career experiences. Language students visit Germany and France to stay with 'exchange' families whilst they work for local businesses.

The school's aims have always been to produce a balanced and rounded education with a timetable which offers a full spread of subjects for all pupils until the end of the Year 9. Chosen subjects for IGCSE are studied in Years 10 & 11 culminating in students achieving high grades in ten or more subjects. 'Twilight GCSEs' have been offered since 1995 offering girls the opportunity to study for additional IGCSEs such as Art and Ancient Greek after school in Years 10 and 11.

A combination of four A Levels/Cambridge Pre-U is the norm in Sixth Form. Students are not restricted by pre-determined subject blocks.

There is an extensive extra-curricular programme with many clubs enriching the academic curriculum.

During the 1970s the link with the Voluntary Service Unit was strengthened. Founded jointly with Sevenoaks School in 1964.

In 1989 the Ship Theatre was opened by Sir Geraint Evans. 'The Ship' is a purpose-built performing arts building which houses a theatre with 'thrust' stage and seating for 199, as well as practise and 'green rooms' for both music and drama departments. 'The Ship Festival' was held to commemorate the opening and has taken place every five years since. The theatre was refurbished to commemorate the school's 175th anniversary in the summer of 2013.

Progress and improvement continue with great enthusiasm reflecting the spirit of adventure of those early missionaries who set sail for distant climes. Despite the passing of 169 years since its foundation, some things remain constant. The Christian ethos of the school is never far from the day's agenda, and girls elect the organisations and events they wish to support each term. In addition, the Christian Fellowship group is run by the girls with a lively programme of visiting speakers for those who would like to attend.

Studying at Walthamstow Hall puts the foundations in place for successful, fulfilling lives in the 21st century. Girls with a Walthamstow Hall education behind them are confident that they have the knowledge, skills and experiences to excel in a competitive world.

Headmistresses
Mrs Foulger was a founder and benefactor of the school in 1838.

Mrs Pye-Smith was succeeded by her own daughter and niece who also gave much of their lives to the care and responsibility of the girls ensuring the continuity and high standards of Mrs Foulger's vision.

Miss Unwin's strict Victorian formality gave way to a more natural and spontaneous style under Miss Millar as Principal for two years until Miss Hare took over.

Miss Hare as headmistress in 1901 and remained for 21 years. She reorganised the timetable and made more time for exercise and after school activities. Lessons were confined to the mornings and girls' health greatly improved.

Miss Euphemia Leys Ramsay became headmistress in 1922 until 1946.

Miss Emmeline Blackburn

Miss Davies came as headmistress in 1970 after five years as principal of a government college in Nigeria for which she received an MBE. She stayed for thirteen years and oversaw some major changes both to the status of the school but also its physical development.

In 1984 Mrs Lang became headmistress. An Old Girl of the school and a graduate of St Anne's College, Oxford, she was the first headmistress to be married and to have daughters. In 1988 the school celebrated its 150th year with a Service of Thanksgiving in Westminster Chapel.  During Mrs Lang's tenure, the school gained its Ship Theatre (1989), a new Sixth Form Centre and Library.

Mrs Jill Milner took over from Mrs Lang in 2002 and, like her predecessor, was a graduate of St Anne's College, Oxford.  Mrs Milner was the first headmistress to be the parent of a Walthamstow Hall pupil. Before joining Walthamstow Hall, Mrs Milner held senior posts at Tonbridge Grammar School for Girls.  Mrs Milner's headship oversaw major development of the school site including the Science Block (2004), a new swimming pool complex (2008) and new facilities for Drama, Music, Design and Technology. In her final term, the Lang Sixth Form Centre opened.

Miss Stephanie Ferro became headmistress in January 2018.  She continues the new tradition of being an alumna of St Anne's College, Oxford.

All of the headmistresses' pictures are placed in the school dining hall.

School motto
The school's motto is Non Palma Sine Pulvere.

The school jewels
On the day that the ship theatre opened, Mrs Lang opened her front door and on the door step was a little box. She opened the little box and in it was a brooch of a ship (the school emblem). Mrs Lang called the brooch the school jewels and wanted it to be passed down from headmistress to headmistress.

Traditions
 There are 14 prefects with silver badges dating back to the start of the school. There are also 12 House Captains, a Music Captain and a Library Captain. Both Prefects and House Captains are elected by the students and teachers. The head girl and deputy head girls are chosen from the prefect and house captain vote. The current headgirl is Lily Purvis. Her deputies are Isabella Whittall and Zoe Brown.
 The prefects and house captains sit on stage behind the headmistress during prayers.
 The Year 13s throw a party for the new Year 7s in their first term.
 The six houses: Chartwell, Penshurst, Quebec, Montreal, Down and Knole all compete in house music, lacrosse and netball, tennis and rounders and athletics.
 House points are given to girls who excel in subjects, do well in homework, for good behaviour, or when a teacher feels it necessary. These points are added up and awards are given to the girl with most points.
 The House Cup is awarded at the end of each year to the house with the most points.  
 A note book is handed down from the outgoing head girl to the new head girl each year, containing useful advice on the role.
 Speech day and prize giving is at the end of the summer term. Years 11, 12 and 13 are all expected to attend with their parents, who hear speeches from notable speakers, the headmistress and the outgoing head girl.  Prizes are given to girls who have excelled in certain subjects over the years.

Leavers ceremony
The leavers ceremony is for the upper sixth to share their wisdom and secrets to the rest of the school.

One student revealed that her mother had written one of her geography essays because she could not understand why her daughter was getting C's and D's. Her mother to her astonishment had received an Unclassified!
After secrets are revealed the crossing over of the sixth form takes place.

One by one a sixth former rises walks towards the headmistress and hugs her then sits down on the other side of the room. When a prefect crosses over she takes off her badge, hands it to the headmistress, hugs the headmistress, hugs the new prefect and sits down in the new prefects seat. The headmistress gives the badge to the new prefect and the new prefect sits in the old prefects' seat.

Notable former pupils

 Janet Kear, ornithologist
 Kathryn Colvin, diplomat
 Dr Beverley J Hunt, MB, ChB, FRCP, FRCPath, MD (1974 leaver).  Dr Hunt is Acting Co-Director of Pathology, Department of Haematology & Lupus Unit, Guy's & St Thomas' Foundation Trust.
 Rowan Pelling, journalist
 Janine Gibson, Editor of Buzzfeed UK
 Margaret Turner-Warwick, physician and first female president of the Royal College of Physicians.

External links
 Walthamstow Hall website
 BBC News: School league table
 Profile on MyDaughter

Private schools in Kent
Girls' schools in Kent
Member schools of the Girls' Schools Association

Schools in Sevenoaks